Ancient Moirang, also known as Keke Moirang, was an ancient civilization that flourished in the southern plains of the present day Manipur, India. The Keke Kangla served as the capital city of the kingdom since time immemorial. The major body of accounts related to the history, literature, mythology of the kingdom are collectively called Moirang Kangleirol.

History

Contemporary periods 
The contemporary periods of the kingdom had parallelism with the Chinese Golden Ages. The period started from 52 BC in Moirang and 208 BC in China.

Genealogy of ancient rulers 
The Moirang Ningthourol (genealogy of the ancient rulers) were calculated with reference to many ancient texts, including the Cheitharol Kumpapa.

Government and Economy

Administration and Commerce 
The Iwang Puriklai (ruler of Moirang) was the absolute monarch of the kingdom. For a smooth and sound administration, the kingdom was divided into eight leikais (wards or sectors). Along with this division, there were also nine organized marketplaces.
There were various institutions of the Phamnaiba Loishangs (Offices hold by Scholars), for smooth and proper conduct of the Thangjing Haraoba in the kingdom.

Culture

Religion 
The ancient people worshipped Lord Thangjing, the presiding deity, as the progenitor of the kingdom.

 Moirang
 Iputhou Pakhangba Laishang
 Ancient Kangleipak

References 

History of India
Pages with unreviewed translations
Meitei culture